"You Wanna Be Americano" is a song by Lou Bega. It is a cover version of the Italian song "Tu vuò fà l'americano" by Renato Carosone. Bega's version starts with an excerpt from "The Star-Spangled Banner". "You Wanna Be Americano" peaked at #38 on the Italian Singles Chart.

Track listing
CD single
 "You Wanna Be Americano" - 3:11
 "Return of "A Little Bit"" - 3:49

Maxi single
 "You Wanna Be Americano" (Album Version) - 20:12
 "You Wanna Be Americano" (Danny Labana Remix) - 3:11 
 "You Wanna Be Americano" (Tommy Gunn Remix) - 3:00 
 "Bachata" (Tommy Gunn - Raggatone Remix) - 13:37
 "Call Your Name" - 2:52

2006 singles
Lou Bega songs
Songs written by Nicola Salerno
2005 songs
Songs written by Lou Bega